Josaphat Bulhak (20 April 1758 – 25 February 1838) was a hierarch of the Ruthenian Uniate Church in the western Russian empire. As head of the church, he had the title of Metropolitan of Kyiv, Galicia, and All Russia. After his death, the Ruthenian Uniate Church was absorbed by the Russian Orthodox Church, making him the last head of the Uniate confession in the Russian empire.

Biography 
He was born into Polish nobility near Brest in the Grand Duchy of Lithuania. In 1763-1774 he was educated in schools of the Basilian order. In 1774, he entered the order and assumed the name Josaphat. In 1782-1784 he got higher education in the Collegio Urbano in Rome, graduating as a Doctor of Theology. In 1787, he was elevated to the Bishop of Turov. In 1795, after the Second Partition of Poland, he was removed from his seat and the Turov bishopric was closed by the Russian government. After the death of Catherine II and the creation of the Roman Catholic Spiritual College in St. Petersburg, Bulhak was appointed to the Uniate department of the college. In 1817, he was appointed to the Metropolitan seat of Kyiv, thus becoming a titular head of the Uniate church in the Russian empire. This appointment was made without prior approval from Rome but was approved after the fact. In 1818, he also served as the head of the Uniate department of the Roman Catholic Spiritual College and also Vice President of the Russian Biblical Fellowship.

During the Polish uprising of 1830–1831, Bulhak had to publicly side with the imperial government. His pastoral letters were printed and distributed in rebellious territories. In the last 10 years of his life, he was surrounded by hierarchs hostile to the independence of the Uniate church, such as Bishop Yosyf Semashko. Though Semashko pushed Bulhak to approve the liquidation of the church, Bulhak never joined this project, and the Church was liquidated by the decisions of the Synod of Polotsk after Bulhak's death.

External links 
 

1758 births
1838 deaths